In 2003, the National Corporation for Antiquities and Museums (NCAM) of the Republic of Sudan launched an international appeal for rescuing the archaeological sites which are going to be inundated by the floods of the Hamdab High Dam currently under construction near Merowe in the Fourth Cataract region of northern Sudan. The new reservoir will cover about 170 km of the Nile valley, and its completion is scheduled for 2007.
H.U.N.E., the Humboldt University Nubian Expedition is one of a group of international expeditions which followed this appeal and joined the Merowe Dam Archaeological Salvage Project (MDASP). H.U.N.E. is based at the Institute of Northeast African Archaeology and Cultural Studies at the Humboldt University of Berlin, Germany. Its main aim is the complete recording of all archaeological sites, including rock art sites, in its concession area by intensive foot surveys and the excavation of chosen representative sites of each archaeological period. The H.U.N.E. concession area comprises four main islands, Us, Sur, Sherari and Shiri and a stretch on the left bank of the Nile from Gebel Musa to the market village of Salamat.
Results of the first two campaigns in the years 2004 and 2005 comprised the discovery of more than 700 archaeological sites and the excavation of a Neolithic settlement site, burials of the Kerma period, and two churches of the Christian era. Apart from rescuing the archaeological sites, H.U.N.E. also took efforts to document the traditions and customs of the local inhabitants of the Dar al-Manasir region, which belong to the Manasir tribe. Their material culture, economic life and poetry are recorded as well.

The Institute of Northeast African Archaeology and Cultural Studies at Humboldt University undertakes substantial financial efforts in order to conduct rescue excavations of several months duration in order to meet the needs of this large-scale project. It is only partly supported by public grants. Therefore, H.U.N.E. offers a sponsorship scheme for archaeological sites to individual persons or institutions.

External links 
 Homepage of the Humboldt University Nubian Expedition (H.U.N.E.)
 Merowe Dam Archaeological Salvage Project

Archaeological sites in Sudan